Hippodamia moesta, the sorrowful lady beetle, is a species of lady beetle in the family Coccinellidae. It is found in North America.

Subspecies
These three subspecies belong to the species Hippodamia moesta:
 Hippodamia moesta bowditchi Johnson, 1910
 Hippodamia moesta moesta LeConte, 1854
 Hippodamia moesta politissima Casey, 1899

References

Further reading

 

Coccinellidae
Articles created by Qbugbot
Beetles described in 1854